MonDevices is a wearable technology company based in New York City. It is best known for its debut product, MonBaby..

Leadership
MonDevices is led by its co-founders Lev Grzhonko, who serves as Chief Executive Officer, and Arturas Vaitaitis, who serves as Chief Technology Officer.

Products
MonDevices develops and manufactures MonBaby, a wearable technology device for monitoring babies that works with an accompanying smartphone app. The device tracks a baby's activity, sleeping position and other factors and transmits information to the parents' phone via the app. MonBaby was invented in 2014 by Vaitaitis, a U.S.-based engineer and inventor.

In November 2014, MonDevices successfully completed a Kickstarter campaign to aid with manufacturing and distributing the first shipment of MonBaby.

References

External links 
 Official Website

Technology companies of the United States